Catherine Carlson was appointed to the Provincial Court of Manitoba on November 23, 2006.

Judge Carlson graduated from the Faculty of Law at the University of Manitoba in 1986. She began her legal career with the Winnipeg law firm of Aikins, MacAulay & Thorvaldson, where she primarily practiced family law.

In 2005, she accepted a position with Justice Canada, working primarily on residential school claims and held the position of senior counsel and team leader in Aboriginal law services.

Her work included co-ordinating litigation involving Indian and Northern Affairs Canada, as well as managing a litigation team. She has also been an active member of the community and has participated on numerous boards including Child Find Manitoba.

References
Government of Manitoba news release (accessed August 3, 2007)

Judges in Manitoba
University of Manitoba alumni
Canadian women judges
Living people
Year of birth missing (living people)